CJK Compatibility Forms is a Unicode block containing vertical glyph variants for east Asian compatibility. Its block name in Unicode 1.0 was CNS 11643 Compatibility, in reference to CNS 11643.

History
The following Unicode-related documents record the purpose and process of defining specific characters in the CJK Compatibility Forms block:

See also 
CJK Unified Ideographs
Vertical Forms

References 

Unicode blocks